Staffield is a hamlet and former civil parish  from Carlisle, now in the parish of Kirkoswald, in the Eden district, in the county of Cumbria, England. In 1931 the parish had a population of 193.

History 
The name "Staffield" means 'Isolated hill marked by a post'. Staffield was a township in Kirkoswald parish. From 1866 Staffield was a civil parish in its own right until it was merged with Kirkoswald on 1 April 1934.

References

External links
 Cumbria County History Trust: Staffield (nb: provisional research only – see Talk page)

Hamlets in Cumbria
Former civil parishes in Cumbria
Kirkoswald, Cumbria